Kültürpark – Atatürk Lisesi is a light-rail station on the Konak Tram of the Tram İzmir system in İzmir, Turkey. Originally named Fuar, it is located on Şair Eşref Boulevard in Kültür, between Kültürpark, and the İzmir Atatürk Lisesi from which the station gets its name. The station consists of an island platforms serving two tracks.

The station opened on 24 March 2018.

Connections
ESHOT operates city bus service on Şair Eşref Boulevard.

Nearby Places of Interest
Kültürpark - The largest city park in the city.
Lozan Square
Montrö Square

Pictures

References

Railway stations opened in 2018
2018 establishments in Turkey
Konak District
Tram transport in İzmir
Things named after Mustafa Kemal Atatürk